Suzi is an English nickname for people with names such as Susan, Suzanne, Susanna or Susannah. 

Notable people with the name include:
 Suzi Digby
 Suzi Ferrer (1940–2006), US/Puerto Rican visual artist and feminist
 Suzi Gardner
 Suzi Lane
 Suzi Leather
 Suzi Lovegrove
 Suzi Oppenheimer
 Suzi Perry
 Suzi Quatro
 Suzi Rawn
 Suzi Schott
 Suzi Shelton
 Suzi Simpson
 Suzi, character on Camp Lakebottom

See also
Suzi, Iran, a village in Khuzestan Province, Iran
Susie (disambiguation)
Susi (disambiguation)
Susy (disambiguation)
Suzie (disambiguation)
Suzy (disambiguation)